Existence Is Futile may refer to:

 Existence Is Futile (Cradle of Filth album), a 2021 album by Cradle of Filth
 Existence Is Futile (Revocation album), a 2009 album by Revocation